

Ashley Taws (born November 1, 1983) is a Canadian racing driver.

Taws started racing at the age of nine when her father bought go-karts for her and her brother.  Taws was a co-winner of the 2002 Rookie of the Year award for Canadian Formula Ford, a season in which she became the first woman in the race series to take a pole position.  She was then injured as a passenger in a traffic accident; she sustained internal injuries and a broken back.  She returned to racing in 2007. In 2008, she competed in the NASCAR Canadian Tire Series in selected races; she only qualified for one race, at Circuit Gilles Villeneuve, where she finished 32nd in the NAPA Autopro 100.

Both prior to her accident, and after her return, Taws was sponsored by Mattel with her driving a pink Barbie car.

Motorsports career results

NASCAR
(key) (Bold – Pole position awarded by qualifying time. Italics – Pole position earned by points standings or practice time. * – Most laps led.)

Canadian Tire Series

References

External links 
Official site

Living people
1983 births
Sportspeople from Newmarket, Ontario
Racing drivers from Ontario
Formula Ford drivers
NASCAR drivers
Sportspeople from Toronto
American female racing drivers
Canadian female racing drivers